The Indian Space Research Organisation (ISRO), over the years, has established a comprehensive global network of ground stations to provide Telemetry, Tracking and Command (TTC) support to satellite and launch vehicle missions. These facilities are grouped under ISRO Telemetry, Tracking and Command Network (ISTRAC) with its headquarters at Bangalore, India.

Facilities
ISTRAC has several facilities as of November 2013:
 ISTRAC facilities in Bangalore consist of TTC ground station (BLR) with full redundancy multi-mission Spacecraft Control Center to carry out and control spacecraft operations and co-ordinate with the network stations. Computer facility with distributed architecture providing independent processors for communications handling, dedicated processors to provide real-time displays for individual spacecraft missions and off-line processors for carrying out spacecraft data archival, analysis and orbit determination.
 Communication Control facility to establish links between SCC and ISTRAC network stations as well as control centers of other participating external space agencies and data receptions stations through dedicated voice, data and TTY links.

Mission
The mission of the ISTRAC includes:
Tracking, commanding and housekeeping data acquisition as well as health analysis and control, orbit and attitude determination and network co-ordination support to all low Earth orbit satellite missions of ISRO throughout their mission life.
Telemetry data acquisition support for ISRO launch vehicle missions from liftoff until satellite acquisition and down range tracking support for monitoring and determining the satellite injection parameters.
Coordinating between spacecraft and launch vehicle teams, supporting ground stations  right from planning till the completion of mission for the national and  international satellite missions.
Telemetry, tracking and command support for the International satellite launch projects.

Ground Stations
ISTRAC has the following TTC ground stations:

India
Hyderabad
Bangalore, also hosts the Indian Spacecraft Control Centre
Lucknow
Port Blair
Sriharikota
Thiruvananthapuram

Global Stations
Port Louis, Mauritius
Bear Lakes, Russia (Медвежьи Озера, Medvezhi Ozera), operating the RT-64 antenna
Biak, Indonesia
Brunei
Svalbard, Norway
Troll, Antarctica
Vietnam
Gatun Lake, Panama
São Tomé and Príncipe, West Africa
 Brunei

See also
Indian Deep Space Network
European Space Tracking
NASA Deep Space Network
Near Earth Network
Space Network

References

External links
ISRO Telemetry, Tracking and Command Network (ISTRAC) - Official Website

Indian Space Research Organisation facilities
Year of establishment missing